James G. Cowie (born in Keith, Scotland - died 1966) was a Scottish footballer.

Career
Cowie started his career with Keith, where he played until joining Raith Rovers in 1926. He joined York City in 1928.

During the 1928–29 season, Cowie scored a total of 56 goals in 56 appearances for York. He scored in York's first game in the Football League against Wigan Borough. He returned to Keith in the summer of 1931.

In 1938, he played alongside his 16-year-old son, also named Jim Cowie, at Keith F.C.

Later in life, Cowie was a keen bowls player and snooker player. He also worked in insurance. He died in 1966.

Notes

People from Keith, Moray
1966 deaths
Scottish footballers
Association football forwards
Raith Rovers F.C. players
York City F.C. players
Keith F.C. players
Year of birth missing
Date of birth missing
Date of death missing
Place of death missing
Sportspeople from Moray